Rollo Maughfling is the Archdruid of Stonehenge and Britain. 
He is a long-time campaigner for the restoration of traditional rights of access to druidic sites, and respect for ancient druidic rituals. He is also a founder member of the Council of British Druid Orders.

Background
Rollo Maughfling was born in Cornwall, the son of an agricultural contractor and from an early age came into contact with Druidic culture, being taken to Druidic ceremonies from the age of four. His father was a close friend of the Archdruid and Grand Bard of Cornwall. Rollo was educated at Bryanston School before leaving for London and becoming involved in the 1960s counter-culture publication The International Times as well as making friends with John Michell and encountering Alex Sanders.

Work
At the age of 16 Rollo left his school and home behind to move to London, becoming involved with the underground newspaper The International Times and establishing the Notting Hill Free School. In the early 70s he retreated to Glastonbury where he would spend the next seventeen years practising as a psychotherapist while developing interests in alternative medicine, Druidism and megalithic culture.

Rollo became head of The Glastonbury Order of Druids in 1970, with a ceremony being made for the order to go public on Glastonbury Tor on May Day 1988. This was followed by another ceremony at Stonehenge during Summer Solstice of the same year.  As Archdruid of Glastonbury and England Rollo presides over seventeen different Druid orders representing some 15,000 Druids. He has described Druidry as "the nature religion of Albion" and considers animism and the spirits of trees to be important, particularly the oak. Rollo sometimes uses a primary chant of three vowels I-A-O to represent the three Druidic rays of light.

In 1988 Rollo was approached by representatives of different Druid orders where he was officially ordained as Archdruid of Britain. A year later The Council of British Druid Orders was formed in an attempt to reclaim rights of access to Stonehenge.

In 2009 Rollo was involved in efforts to rebury Charlie, a skeletal human remain on display at the National trust museum in Avebury. 

Rollo has continued to work for free and open access to Stonehenge through meetings involving the local council of Salisbury and other interested parties including other Druid groups and individuals, the National Trust, English Heritage and the police.  As part of this effort he has also exercised influence over the traffic regulation enquiries for this area.  Rollo has led public demonstrations against a tunnel being built underneath the stones.  He has also been successful in efforts to fund an illuminated acoustic stage during open access.

Books
 Druidlore Issue 1, Druidlore ASIN B00E4D3RAY 1997

References

Neo-druids
British modern pagans
People from Cornwall
People educated at Bryanston School

 Hutton, Ronald, Witches, Druids and King Arthur, Hambledon Continuum, 2006, p. 256
 Hopmann, Ellen Evert, A Legacy of Druids: Conversations with Druid leaders of Britain, the USA and Canada, past and present, Moon Books 29 April 2016,  Rollo Maughling interview 18 June 1996
 Byghan, Yowann, Modern Druidism: An Introduction, McFarland 9 June 2018, ASIN B07DMRF2P9 Rollo Maughling and COBDO interview

External links
 "The Council of British Druid Orders official site"
 "Archdruid Rollo Maughling leads call for peace at Stonehenge 21st June 2014"